Gabriela "Gigi" Coletta is an American politician who represents District 1 on the Boston City Council. She was first elected on May 3, 2022. Prior to being elected to the Boston City Councilor, Gabriela Coletta served as Chief of Staff for former City Councilor Lydia Edwards until 2021 and then went on to serve as External Relations Manager for the New England Aquarium.

Election Results 
2022

Gabriela Coletta ran in a special election campaign against Tania del Rio to fill in former City Councilor Lydia Edwards seat. Voter turnout in the special election was low with only 4,923 ballots being cast; Coletta garnered about 57% of the votes, Del Rio received 33%, and Jorge Mendoza, who ran as a write-in candidate, got 10% of the votes.

References 

Living people
Boston City Council members
Massachusetts Democrats
21st-century American politicians
Year of birth missing (living people)